The men's 200 metre individual medley event at the 2016 Summer Olympics took place on 10–11 August at the Olympic Aquatics Stadium.

Summary
As the most decorated Olympian of all-time, Michael Phelps continued to etch his name into the history records with a first Olympic four-peat in the same individual swimming event. Hanging with some of his career rivals at the final turn, Phelps established a body-length lead over the rest of the field on the freestyle leg to claim his 22nd gold medal and 26th overall in 1:54.66. Trailing almost two seconds behind Phelps, Japan's Kosuke Hagino produced a late surge to snatch the silver with a 1:56.61. Meanwhile, China's Wang Shun took home the bronze in 1:57.05, joining Hagino as the first Asian men to stand on the podium in this event.

Hagino's teammate Hiromasa Fujimori missed out of the medals with a fourth-place time in 1:57.21. Phelps' longtime rival and twelve-time medalist Ryan Lochte seized a brief lead into the halfway point with a signature backstroke swim, but faded down the home stretch to fifth, and missed out on his fourth straight medal in this event with a 1:57.47, a hundredth of a second ahead of Germany's Philip Heintz (1:57.48). Backed by the raucous home crowd, Brazilian medal favorite Thiago Pereira, who got off to an early lead with a powerful butterfly effort, slipped to seventh with a 1:58.02. Great Britain's Daniel Wallace posted an eighth-place finish of 1:58.54 to round out the field.

Records
Prior to this competition, the existing world and Olympic records were as follows.

Competition format

The competition consisted of three rounds: heats, semifinals, and a final. The swimmers with the best 16 times in the heats advanced to the semifinals. The swimmers with the best 8 times in the semifinals advanced to the final. Swim-offs were used as necessary to break ties for advancement to the next round.

Results

Heats

Semifinals

Semifinal 1

Semifinal 2

Final

References

Men's 00200 metre individual medley
Olympics
Men's events at the 2016 Summer Olympics